Stenella paulliniae is a species of anamorphic fungi.

References

External links

paulliniae
Fungi described in 2005